Hugues Evrard Zagbayou (born 14 May 1990), better known as just Evrard Zag, is an Ivorian professional footballer who plays as a midfielder for Portuguese club Leixões.

Professional career
Zag began his senior career with the Ivorian club ASEC Mimosas in 2008, before moving to Portugal with Oliveirense in 2014. After a stint with Salgueiros, he moved to Vizela in 2017. He made his professional debut with Vizela in a 2–1 LigaPro win over Oliveirense on 12 September 2020.

International career
Zag debuted for the Ivory Coast national team in a 2–0 2014 African Nations Championship qualification win over Nigeria on 27 July 2013.

References

External links
 
 
 

1990 births
Living people
People from Gagnoa
Ivorian footballers
Ivory Coast international footballers
ASEC Mimosas players
AD Oliveirense players
S.C. Salgueiros players
F.C. Vizela players
Leixões S.C. players
Liga Portugal 2 players
Campeonato de Portugal (league) players
Ligue 1 (Ivory Coast) players
Association football midfielders
Ivorian expatriate footballers
Ivorian expatriate sportspeople in Portugal
Expatriate footballers in Portugal